UFM may refer to:

UFM100.3, a Mandarin radio station in Singapore
Ultrasonic force microscopy
Unidad Falangista Montañesa, a Spanish political party
Union for the Mediterranean, an intergovernmental organisation
United Farmers of Manitoba, an agrarian political movement
Universidad Francisco Marroquin, a university in Guatemala